Delak is the district center of Dawlat Yar district, Ghor province, Afghanistan. It has an elevation of

Climate
Delak has a humid continental climate (Köppen climate classification: Dsb) with warm, dry summers and cold, snowy winters.

See also 
 Ghōr Province

References 

Populated places in Ghor Province